Phil Barkdoll (born September 7, 1937) is a former NASCAR owner/driver from Phoenix, Arizona, who only ran at two tracks in his entire career, racing at Daytona International Speedway and Talladega Superspeedway.

NASCAR career
Barkdoll campaigned part-time on the NASCAR circuit from 1984 to 1997, relying on small sponsorships and free advertising to help pay for his racing.  He has provided a ride for other drivers at other tracks. Barkdoll began racing in 1981, with his first race coming in the 1984 Winston 500. After starting 16th, Phil finished 35th after losing an engine on the 60th lap. 1985 saw Barkdoll compete for his mother-in-law's race team, Helen Rae Motorsports, driving the No. 00 at both Talladega races, finishing 35th and 22nd, respectively.

In 1987, Barkdoll had a spectacular accident heading into the tri-oval on the fourth lap during one of the Twin 125 mile qualifying races for the Daytona 500. He got airborne, flipped across the track and into the fence before sliding to a halt on his wheels. In 1988, Barkdoll was  involved in another spectacular accident at Daytona, this time in the Daytona 500 itself. Coming of turn four on the 106th circuit, he slightly tapped Richard Petty, which sent Petty tumbling down the track before being t-boned by Brett Bodine.

On the 144th lap of the 1989 Daytona 500, Barkdoll took yet another wild ride. Barkdoll's Oldsmobile slid into the dirt embankment on the backstretch, and ended up on its side.

In 1990, Barkdoll campaigned a second car which was driven by Stan Barrett (Stanton Barrett's father) for the Daytona 500 and Phil Parsons during the Winston 500 and the Winston.

Barkdoll had even more trouble at the 1991 Daytona 500, and he went for a spin off turn four and the car lifted off the ground and blew out the windshield. This time the car landed on all four wheels and Barkdoll finished  20th. Barkdoll's final Winston Cup points paying start came in 1992 in the Pepsi 400 at Daytona. He finished 28th, four laps off the pace.

In 1993, Barkdoll was diagnosed with cancer, and Stanley Smith drove his car in the Twin 125's at Daytona. Smith was eliminated in a first lap wreck with Steve Kinser, and did not make the field. Barkdoll would return from his absence in 1994, but would miss the 500. It was Barkdoll's first DNQ in the 500 since 1987.
In 1995, Barkdoll had a strong run in the second qualifier in his No. 73 Ford, but it ended in a crash coming off turn two, resulting in another DNQ. 

In 1997, Barkdoll returned to the 500 after skipping the race in 1996. He would qualify 25th fastest on pole qualifying day in his No. 73 Chevrolet. Barkdoll's speed was fast enough to earn the 38th starting position after he failed to finish in the top 15 of his Twin 125. However, SABCO Racing's No. 42 Bellsouth Chevrolet for Joe Nemechek failed to qualify for the race. SABCO team owner Felix Sabates worked a deal with Barkdoll and bought the 73 car for Nemechek, leaving Barkdoll on the sidelines, but richer as a result. Nemechek would crash late, finishing 27th. Barkdoll would attempt to qualify for Talladega later in the season, but would miss the field.

Car owner
Barkdoll owned the car that he drove in most of the Winston Cup races that he competed in during his career (with the exception of the two races in 1985 that his car was owned by his mother-in-law, Helen Rae Smith, who also sponsored several cars that were known as the Helen Rae Special. In addition, he fielded cars for drivers such as Ken Bouchard, Jim Sauter, Mike Wallace, Joe Ruttman and Morgan Shepherd. 

In 1998, Barkdoll fielded a car in the Daytona 500 supported by longtime sponsor X-1R Performance. Barkdoll would practice and qualify the car, but he would place Mike Wallace behind the wheel prior to the 125s. Wallace  raced into the 500 and finished 23rd, one lap down.  The following season, Barkdoll fielded his No. 73 with sponsorship from Three Stooges Beer at the Daytona 500 for the final time, driver Ken Bouchard was unable to qualify for the race.

Motorsports career results

NASCAR
(key) (Bold – Pole position awarded by qualifying time. Italics – Pole position earned by points standings or practice time. * – Most laps led.)

Winston Cup Series

Daytona 500

ARCA Hooters SuperCar Series
(key) (Bold – Pole position awarded by qualifying time. Italics – Pole position earned by points standings or practice time. * – Most laps led.)

References

External links 
 
 
 

Living people
1937 births
Racing drivers from Phoenix, Arizona
NASCAR drivers
NASCAR team owners